Charles Altieri is the Rachel Stageberg Anderson Professor and Chair in the Department of English at the University of California, Berkeley.

Background
Altieri specializes in 20th century American and British Literature and teaches graduate courses on Nineteenth Century Thought, Victorian Literature, Modern and Contemporary English and American Poetry, Modern and Classical Literary Theory, Literature and the Visual Arts, and seminars on specific poets, theoretical problems, and interdisciplinary period studies. In his book on the reading of Wallace Stevens as a poet of what Altieri calls 'philosophical poetry', Altieri discusses his own reading of the relevance of such philosophers as Hegel and Wittgenstein while presenting a speculative interpretation of Stevens under this interpretative approach.

Awards
Summer Fellowship, New York State, 1971, 1973, 1974, 1975.
NEH Younger Humanist Fellowship, 1975.
Invited Fellow: Institute for Advanced Study in the Behavioral Sciences, Palo Alto, 1980-1981.
Guggenheim Fellow, 1980-1981.
Co-Director EH Summer Institute on Ethics and Aesthetics, 1993.
Elected to American Academy of Arts and Sciences (April, 2003)

Books
Bibliography of Modern and Contemporary Anglo-American Poetry.  Chicago: AHM Publishing Corp., Spring, 1979.
Enlarging the Temple: New Directions in American Poetry of the 1960s.  Lewisburg, PA: Bucknell University Press, Spring 1979.
Act and Quality: A Theory of Literary Meaning.  Amherst: University of Massachusetts Press, 1981.
Self and Sensibility in Contemporary American Poetry.  New York: Cambridge University Press, 1984.
Painterly Abstraction in Modernist American Poetry: The Contemporaneity of Modernism.  New York: Cambridge University Press, 1989. Paperback: Penn State Press, 1994.
Canons and Consequences.  Evanston: Northwestern University Press, 1990.
Subjective Agency: A Theory of First-Person Expressivity and its Social Implications.  Oxford: Blackwells, 1994.
Postmodernism Now: Essays on Contemporaneity in the Arts.  University Park: Penn State University Press, 1998.
The Particulars of Rapture: An Aesthetics of the Affects.  Ithaca: Cornell University Press, 2003.
The Art of Modern American Poetry.  Oxford. Blackwells, 2005.
Wallace Stevens and the Demands of Modernity: Toward a Phenomenology of Value.  Ithaca : Cornell University Press, 2013

References

Living people
Year of birth missing (living people)
University of California, Berkeley College of Letters and Science faculty